"Let's Not Play the Game" is a song by American R&B singer Maxwell, and is featured in the movie and soundtrack from the film The Best Man. It was released as the lead single from the film's soundtrack, and charted on Billboard's top R&B/Hip-Hop Songs.

Charts

References

	

1999 singles
Maxwell (musician) songs
1999 songs
Songs written by Maxwell (musician)